Happy Sixteen (俏皮女學生, Chiu pei nui hok sang) is a 1982 Hong Kong film directed by Michael Mak Dong-Git.

Synopsis
The film is about the life of a group of sixteen year olds who have fun hanging out, dancing and partying etc.. In amongst this, the teenagers play pranks on a biology teacher who wakes up in a meadow. The plot also involves a love triangle.

Cast

Reception

Awards
2nd Hong Kong Film Awards
 Won: Best Original Film Song
 Nominated: Best New Performer - Irene Wan

References

External links
 
 HKMDB: 俏皮女學生Happy Sixteen

Hong Kong drama films
1982 films
1980s Hong Kong films